Kansanshi Dynamos Football Club is a Zambian football club based in Solwezi. They play in the first division of Zambian football. Their home stadium is Solwezi Independence Stadium.

References

Football clubs in Zambia